The 2009-10 version of the Syrian Cup is the 40th edition to be played. It is the premier knockout tournament for football teams in Syria.

Al-Karamah went into this edition as the holders.

The cup winner were guaranteed a place in the 2011 AFC Cup.

First round
32 teams play a knockout tie. 16 clubs advance to the next round. Games played over two legs

The games were played on May 10–19, 2010.

|}
¹ Azaz failed to the 2nd leg, match awarded 3-0 to Al-Nawair.

² Ommal Al-Quneitra failed to the First round, matches awarded 3–0 to Afrin.

Round of 16
16 teams play a knockout tie. 8 clubs advance to the next round. Games played over two legs

The games were played on May 18–26, 2010.

|}
¹ Hutteen failed to the 2nd leg, match awarded 3–0 to Al-Jazeera.

Quarter-finals
8 teams play a knockout tie. 4 clubs advance to the next round. Games played over two legs

The games were played on May 28–1 June 2010.

|}

Semi-finals
4 teams played a knockout tie. 2 clubs advanced to the Final. Games played over two legs.

The games were played on June 4–08, 2010.

|}

Final

Syrian Cup Winner

External links
 Details on goalzz.com

2009-10
2009–10 domestic association football cups
Cup